Ramsay Conservation Park is a protected area in the Australian state of South Australia located in the Yorke Peninsula in the locality of Ramsay about  west-northwest of the town of Port Vincent.

The conservation park consists of crown land in "Allotment 10 of Deposited Plan 72948" of the cadastral unit of the Hundred of Ramsay. It came into existence on 14 February 2008 by proclamation under the National Parks and Wildlife Act 1972. On the same day, a separate proclamation ensured that “certain existing and future rights of entry, prospecting, exploration or mining” permitted under the state's Mining Act 1971 and Petroleum and Geothermal Energy Act 2000 would apply to the extent of the conservation park.

The following statement of significance appears in its management plan:Ramsay Conservation Park (147.2 hectares; proclaimed in 2008) is a small park in the Minlaton-Curramulka Threatened Habitat Area. Its dominant vegetation is sheoak and mallee, with very low woodlands and a grassy understorey. It occurs in a high priority bioregion and conserves some species of conservation significance, including the nationally and state endangered Jumping-jack Wattle (Acacia enterocarpa), which has not been recorded thus far in any other National Parks and Wildlife Act reserves on Yorke Peninsula. 

The conservation park is classified as an IUCN Category VI protected area.

References

External links
Ramsay Conservation Park webpage on protected planet

Conservation parks of South Australia
Protected areas established in 2008
2008 establishments in Australia
Yorke Peninsula